Lamnostoma mindora is an eel in the family Ophichthidae (worm/snake eels). It was described by David Starr Jordan and Robert Earl Richardson in 1908. It is a tropical, freshwater eel which is known from Asia and Oceania, including the Philippines and New Guinea.

References

Ophichthidae
Fish described in 1908
Taxa named by David Starr Jordan
Taxa named by Robert Earl Richardson